One November Yankee is a play by American writer Josh Ravetch. It was first performed at The Pasadena Playhouse as a workshop production with Robert Forster and Loretta Swit as part of their Hot House Series before opening at The NoHo Arts Center in 2012. The play starred two time Emmy winner, and TV's Hot Lips Houlihan from M*A*S*H*, Loretta Swit, and LA Law's Harry Hamlin. The set was designed by Dana Moran Williams. The film rights were picked up by Pam Williams Productions as a feature film for Ravetch to adapt and direct. 

The play will enjoy its east coast premiere in October, 2019 at the Delaware Theatre Company in Wilmington starring Harry Hamlin reprising his role from the first production and Hart to Hart’s Stefanie Powers. 

The play moves to off-Broadway’s 59e59th street theatre in December, 2019. 

The striking and theatrical conceit at the center of the play is a full sized single engine Piper cub airplane crashed center stage. It is an art installation based on a real plane crash where a brother and sister disappeared into the mountains of New Hampshire and were never found. The second scene has smoke pouring from the engine, trees appearing where the white museum walls once were and we get to actually see what happened when the plane originally went down. And so, the play moves in ways you can’t predict with a very surprising and unexpected ending.

References 

American plays
2012 plays